I Told You So is a 1970 Ghanaian movie. The movie portrays Ghanaians and their way of life in a satirical style. It also gives insight into the life of a young lady who did not take the advice of her father when about to marry a man, she did not know anything about the man she was going to marry, but rather took her mother's and uncle's advice because of the wealth and power the man has.

The young lady later finds out that the man she is supposed to marry was an armed robber. She was unhappy of the whole incident. When her dad ask what had happened, she replied that the man she was supposed to marry is an armed robber; her father ended by saying "I told you so".

Cast
Bobe Cole
Margret Quainoo (Araba Stamp)
Kweku Crankson (Osuo Abrobor)

References

External links
 
 I TOLD YOU SO GHANAIAN MOVIE

1970 films
Ghanaian comedy films
1970 comedy films